The Mental Deficiency Act 1913 was an act of Parliament of the United Kingdom creating provisions for the institutional treatment of people deemed to be "feeble-minded" and "moral defectives". "It proposed an institutional separation so that mental defectives should be taken out of Poor Law institutions and prisons into newly established colonies."

Background
The Idiots Act 1886 made the legal distinction between "idiots" and "imbeciles". It contained educational provisions for the needs of people deemed to be in these categories. In 1904, the Royal Commission on the Care and Control of the Feeble-Minded was established with the warrant "to consider the existing methods of dealing with idiots and epileptics, and with imbecile, feeble-minded, or defective persons not certified under the Lunacy Laws... to report as to the amendments in the law or other measures which should be adopted in the matter". The Commission returned a lengthy report in 1908 which estimated that of a population of 32,527,843 British inhabitants 149,628 people (0.46%) were considered "mentally defective". It recommended the establishment of a board of control which would oversee local authority efforts aimed at "the well-being of the mentally defective".

Winston Churchill spoke of the need to introduce compulsory labour camps for "mental defectives" in the House of Commons in February 1911. In May 1912, a Private Members' Bill entitled the "Feeble-Minded Control Bill" was introduced in the House of Commons, which called for the implementation of the Royal Commission's conclusions. It rejected sterilisation of the "feeble-minded", but had provision for registration and segregation. One of the few to raise objections to the bill was G.K. Chesterton who ridiculed the bill, calling it the "Feeble-Minded Bill, both for brevity and because the description is strictly accurate". The bill was withdrawn, but a government bill introduced on 10 June 1912 replaced it, which would become the Mental Deficiency Act 1913.

Mental Deficiency Act 

The bill was passed in 1913 with only three MPs voting against it. One of them was Josiah Wedgwood, who attempted to filibuster and said of it, "It is a spirit of the Horrible Eugenic Society which is setting out to breed up the working class as though they were cattle." The new act repealed the Idiots Act 1886 and followed the recommendations of the Royal Commission on the Care and Control of the Feeble-Minded. It established the Board of Control for Lunacy and Mental Deficiency to oversee the implementation of provisions for the care and management of four classes of people,
a) Idiots. Those so deeply defective as to be unable to guard themselves against common physical dangers.

b) Imbeciles. Whose defectiveness does not amount to idiocy, but is so pronounced that they are incapable of managing themselves or their affairs, or, in the case of children, of being taught to do so.

c) Feeble-minded persons. Whose weakness does not amount to imbecility, yet who require care, supervision, or control, for their protection or for the protection of others, or, in the case of children, are incapable of receiving benefit from the instruction in ordinary schools.

d) Moral Imbeciles. Displaying mental weakness coupled with strong vicious or criminal propensities, and on whom punishment has little or no deterrent effect.

A person deemed to be an idiot or imbecile might be placed in an institution or under guardianship if the parent or guardian so petitioned, as could a person of any of the four categories under 21 years, as could a person of any category who had been abandoned, neglected, guilty of a crime, in a state institution, habitually drunk, or unable to be schooled.

At the height of operation of the Mental Deficiency Act, 65,000 people were placed in "colonies" or in other institutional settings. The act remained in effect until it was repealed by the Mental Health Act 1959.

Jurisdiction 
The act applied to England and Wales. An equivalent piece of legislation the Mental Deficiency and Lunacy Act (Scotland) 1913 covered Scotland.

References

External links
 The text of the act.
 UK Mental Deficiency Act, 1913 An audio file perspective on the Act by Lee Humber of Oxford Brookes University.

United Kingdom Acts of Parliament 1913
Mental health legal history of the United Kingdom
Ableism